Thulani Siphamandla Ngidi (born 11 January 1986 in Durban, South Africa) is a South African rugby union player, who most recently played with the . His regular position is tighthead prop. Retired from the sport 2016

Career

Youth and amateur rugby
After representing amateur side Jaguars at the National Club Championships in 2006, he played for the  side in the 2007 Under-21 Provincial Championship.

Falcons
His first experience of first class rugby was in 2010. He started their first seven matches of the season and played off the bench in three more matches as the  finished in last position in the competition.

He made a further eight appearances for the side during the 2011 Vodacom Cup competition (seven of those as a substitute) and just three appearances in the 2011 Currie Cup First Division.

College Rovers
Ngidi then returned to KwaZulu-Natal where he was a member of the College Rovers side that finished runners-up at the inaugural edition of the amateur club competition, the SARU Community Cup in 2013. He made one start during the pool stages of the competition and came on as a substitute in their semi-final match against Brakpan, but was not used in the final as College Rovers suffered a 26–24 defeat to Despatch.

Return to Falcons
He returned to provincial rugby in 2014 to play for Falcons again.

He remained with the Falcons for the 2015 season, making a total of seventeen first class appearances in the Vodacom Cup, Currie Cup qualification and Currie Cup First Division competitions.

References

1986 births
Living people
Falcons (rugby union) players
Rugby union players from Durban
Rugby union props
South African rugby union players